Marinactinospora is a genus in the phylum Actinomycetota (Bacteria).

Etymology
The name Marinactinospora derives from the Latin adjective marinus, of or belonging to the sea; Greek noun aktis, aktinos (ἀκτίς, ἀκτῖνος), a beam; Greek noun spora (σπορά), a seed, and in biology a spore; New Latin feminine gender noun Marinactinospora, marine and spored ray, referring to marine spore-forming actinomycete.

Species
The genus contains a single species, namely M. thermotolerans ( Tian et al. 2009,  (Type species of the genus).; Greek noun thermē (θέρμη), heat; Latin participle adjective tolerans, tolerating; New Latin participle adjective thermotolerans, able to tolerate a high temperature.)

See also
 Bacterial taxonomy
 Microbiology

References 

Actinomycetota
Bacteria genera
Marine biology